Max Chandler-Mather (born 1991–1992) is an Australian politician and trade unionist. He is the Greens member for the Division of Griffith following the 2022 Australian federal election, having defeated the incumbent Labor Party member Terri Butler.

A resident of Woolloongabba, Chandler-Mather is a member of the Queensland Greens and worked for the party prior to being elected to parliament.

Early life and career
Chandler-Mather grew up in the suburb of West End. His parents, Tim Mather and Kim Chandler, were members of the Labor Party (ALP).

Chandler-Mather completed a Bachelor of Arts with First Class Honours in History at the University of Queensland. While at university Chandler-Mather was a member of the Labor Party (ALP), and a member of the Labor Left faction, after being encouraged to join by his parents. During this time, he worked part-time as a call centre worker at the trade union United Voice. Chandler-Mather quit the party in 2013, stating in 2022 that he could not remain as a member of the Labor Party following Kevin Rudd's establishment of off-shore detention centres in Nauru.

After graduating, Chandler-Mather was a trade union organiser for the National Tertiary Education Union.

Despite not being a member of the Greens at the time, Chandler-Mather was employed as Jonathan Sriranganathan's campaign manager for his successful 2016 campaign for Brisbane City Council. Chandler-Mather and Sriranganathan organised their campaign around the left-wing social theory of the right to the city, arguing that property developers and banks have turned cities such as Brisbane into 'the new factory', resulting in people believing they do not have power over local communities.

Political career
After Sriranganathan's successful campaign, Chandler-Mather was employed as a full-time campaign strategist for the Queensland Greens, and aimed to take the seat of Griffith. Chandler-Mather contested Griffith at the 2019 Australian federal election and achieved a 6.6% swing, but failed to get elected.

Chandler-Mather re-contested Griffith at the 2022 Australian federal election, and won the seat of Griffith with a 10.9% swing. His campaign was aimed at community engagement with politics, particularly local aircraft noise and housing affordability campaigns, and reportedly had over 1,000 volunteers who door-knocked 29,000 homes. Following his election to the Australian parliament, Chandler-Mather was appointed the party's spokesperson on housing and homelessness.

Political positions
In a 2020 interview with Tom Ballard, Chandler-Mather expressed a desire to turn the Queensland Greens into a mass party that was primarily supported by the working class, though he stated he did not identify as a socialist ideologically, instead claiming that his priorities merely overlapped with what is often perceived as socialism. Chandler-Mather's positions were deemed by the Green Left Weekly to be firmly on the left-wing of the Greens, with him supporting a four-day workweek and public ownership of the electricity and telecommunications industries. Chandler-Mather describes his politics during his time at university as supporting democratic socialism.

Electoral history

References

Living people
Australian Greens members of the Parliament of Australia
21st-century Australian politicians
Members of the Australian House of Representatives for Griffith
Year of birth missing (living people)
Australian trade unionists